Madonna and Child with St Michael and St Bernardino is a 1476 tempera and gold on panel triptych by Neroccio di Bartolomeo de' Landi, now in the Pinacoteca Nazionale in Siena. To the left is St Michael, whilst to the right is Bernardino of Siena.

References

1476 paintings
Paintings of the Madonna and Child
Paintings depicting Michael (archangel)
Paintings of Bernardino of Siena
Paintings in the Pinacoteca Nazionale (Siena)